The 2011 European Masters Games is the second edition of the multi-sport event for masters sport, scheduled to take place between 10–20 September 2011 in the areas of Lignano Sabbiadoro and Friuli-Venezia Giulia in Italy.

It featured 21 sports, mostly for people aged 35 and above, although some disciplines will allow younger athletes to participate.

Sports
https://www.imga.ch/assets/Uploads/Reports/EMG2008-Final-Report.pdf

Main
https://web.archive.org/web/20131218080033/http://www.lignano2011.it/index.php?op=2028

Archery (40 to 60)
Athletics (30 to 100)
Beach rugby
Beach volleyball
Canoe kayak
Clay pigeon shooting (30 to 70)
Cycling
Dancesport
Fencing
Futsal
Golf
Handball
Judo
Karate
Orienteering
Rowing
Sailing
Taekwondo
Tennis
Triathlon
Weightlifting

Paralympic Sports
https://web.archive.org/web/20131218075942/http://www.lignano2011.it/index.php?op=1472

ATHLETICS

Age classes Paralympics: Men and Woman:30 over =Born in 1981 or before.

Competition Specialities Paralympics (Deambulants, Wheelchairs and sport blinds).

Men and Woman: 100mt; 200mt; shot put; discus. (According to IPC-IAAF rules)

 

CANOE - KAYAK

Age classes Paralympics: Men and Woman: Open.

Competition Categories Paralympics: Men and Woman – 2: (K1, V1).

Competition Categories Paralympics: Men and Woman – 3: (A,TA, LTA).

Distances Paralympics: Men and Woman - 1: mt. 200.

 

CYCLING

Age Classes for Paralympics: Men and Woman -  1 : 30  over.

Competition Specialities for Paralympics: Men and Woman – 2: (Handbyke and Tandem for blinds)

CLAY TARGET

Age classes Paralympics: Men and Woman: 30 over = born in 1981 or before.

Competition Specialities Paralympics (Deambulants, Wheelchairs).

Men and Woman

JUDO

Age classes Paralympics: Men and Woman: Age-classes are open. 

All athletes must be born in 1981 or before.

Competition Categories (Blinds).

Men - 4: kg. 66, kg. 73, kg.  81, kg .+ 81.

Woman - 4: kg. 52, kg. 57, kg. 63, kg. +63.

 

ORIENTEERING

Age Classes : Open elite and Paralympics M+ W+: 35 over.

Competition Specialities: Men and Woman - 1: TRAIL-O.

 

HANDBALL

Age Classes: (Deafs).

Men - 1: 35 over.

Woman - 1: 33 over.

Composition of teams: Maximum: 16, Minimum: 8  athletes for each team.

 

ARCHERY

Age classes Paralympics: Men and Woman – 1: 40 over.

Distances: Men and Woman  - 1: Olympic: mt. 60.

Men and Woman - 1: Compound: mt. 50.

References

Results
 https://www.imga.ch/en/data/27
 https://www.imga.ch/assets/Uploads/Reports/EMG-Lignano-2011-Final-Report.pdf
 https://www.imga.ch/assets/Uploads/Results/All-Archery-Results.pdf
 https://www.imga.ch/assets/Uploads/Results/ATHLETICS.pdf
 https://www.imga.ch/assets/Uploads/Results/All-Beach-Volley-Results.pdf
 https://www.imga.ch/assets/Uploads/Results/All-Cycling-Results.pdf
 https://www.imga.ch/assets/Uploads/Results/DANCE-SPORT.pdf
 https://www.imga.ch/assets/Uploads/Results/FUTSAL.pdf
 https://www.imga.ch/assets/Uploads/Results/20110915-08-GOLF-Netto-Udine.pdf
 https://www.imga.ch/assets/Uploads/Results/HANDBALL.pdf
 https://www.imga.ch/assets/Uploads/Results/JUDO.pdf
 https://www.imga.ch/assets/Uploads/Results/2011-12-orienteering-results-merged.pdf
 https://www.imga.ch/assets/Uploads/Results/All-Rowing-Results.pdf
 https://www.imga.ch/assets/Uploads/Results/All-Sailing-Results.pdf
 https://www.imga.ch/assets/Uploads/Results/TEAKWONDO.pdf
 https://www.imga.ch/assets/Uploads/Results/Triathlon-Results-Book.pdf
 https://www.imga.ch/assets/Uploads/Results/ALL-WEIGHTLIFTING-RESULTS-2011.pdf
 http://websites.sportstg.com/select_node.cgi?cID=2209&p=1
 http://websites.sportstg.com/assoc_page.cgi?assoc=4653&pID=1
 http://websites.sportstg.com/assoc_page.cgi?assoc=4655&pID=1
 http://websites.sportstg.com/assoc_page.cgi?assoc=4660&pID=1
 http://websites.sportstg.com/assoc_page.cgi?assoc=4664&pID=1
 http://websites.sportstg.com/assoc_page.cgi?assoc=4667&pID=1
 http://websites.sportstg.com/assoc_page.cgi?assoc=4682&pID=1
 http://websites.sportstg.com/assoc_page.cgi?assoc=4671&pID=1
 http://websites.sportstg.com/assoc_page.cgi?assoc=4673&pID=1
 http://websites.sportstg.com/assoc_page.cgi?assoc=4654&pID=1
 http://websites.sportstg.com/assoc_page.cgi?assoc=4656&pID=1
 http://websites.sportstg.com/assoc_page.cgi?assoc=4670&pID=1
 http://websites.sportstg.com/assoc_page.cgi?assoc=4679&pID=1
 http://websites.sportstg.com/assoc_page.cgi?assoc=4676&pID=1
 http://websites.sportstg.com/assoc_page.cgi?assoc=4665&pID=1
 http://websites.sportstg.com/assoc_page.cgi?assoc=4674&pID=1
 http://websites.sportstg.com/assoc_page.cgi?c=1-8696-0-0-0&sID=228027
 http://websites.sportstg.com/assoc_page.cgi?c=1-8696-0-0-0&sID=228031
 https://www.cpsa.co.uk/userfiles/files/EMG2011.pdf

External links
2011 European Masters Games
Website
 https://web.archive.org/web/20131218075953/http://www.lignano2011.it/index.php?op=1366
 https://web.archive.org/web/20131218075942/http://www.lignano2011.it/index.php?op=1472

Masters Games
European Masters Games
European Masters Games
Multi-sport events in Italy
Sport in Friuli-Venezia Giulia
International sports competitions hosted by Italy
September 2011 sports events in Italy